WXVI (1600 AM) is a radio station broadcasting a gospel music format. Licensed to Montgomery, Alabama, United States, the station serves the greater Montgomery area.  The station is owned by New Life Ministries, Inc.

References

External links

XVI
Gospel radio stations in the United States
Radio stations established in 1965
1965 establishments in Alabama
XVI